British Cameroon or the British Cameroons was a British mandate territory in British West Africa, formed of the Northern Cameroons and Southern Cameroons. Today, the Northern Cameroons forms parts of the Borno, Adamawa and Taraba states of Nigeria, while the Southern Cameroons forms part of the Northwest and Southwest regions of Cameroon.

History

The area of present-day Cameroon was claimed by Germany as a protectorate during the "Scramble for Africa" at the end of the 19th century. The German Empire named the territory Kamerun. During World War I, French and British troops invaded the German colony Kamerun (Present day Cameroon) and decided to divide the German colony into two regions. One of the regions would be French administered (French Cameroon) and the other would be British administered (British Cameroon). The British were more concerned with other areas of Africa, specifically Nigeria. Thus, the French gained a larger portion of Cameroon when the country was divided.

League of Nations mandate
During the First World War, it was occupied by British, French and Belgian troops, and a later League of Nations mandate to Great Britain and France by the League of Nations in 1922. The French mandate was known as Cameroun and the British territory was administered as two areas, Northern Cameroons and Southern Cameroons. Northern Cameroons consisted of two non-contiguous sections, divided by a point where the Nigerian and Cameroun borders met.  In the 1930s, most of the white population consisted of Germans, who were interned in British camps starting in June 1940. The native population of 400,000 showed little interest in volunteering for the British forces; only 3,500 men did so.

Trust territory
When the League of Nations ceased to exist in 1946, most of the mandate territories were reclassified as UN trust territories, henceforth administered through the UN Trusteeship Council. The object of trusteeship was to prepare the lands for eventual independence. The United Nations approved the Trusteeship Agreements for British Cameroons to be governed by Britain on 6 December 1946.

Colonial legacy 
Under colonial rule, Cameroon was ruled on the basis of indirect rule which allowed natives to execute judicial and executive decisions. The British Cameroon used indirect rule because it meant that Cameroonians would comply willingly rather than having to coercively force compliance. This was important because it gave citizens of British Cameroon autonomy and helped to establish “a greater vitality of local political institutions in West Cameroon”. Despite the indirect rule used to invigorate the spirit of citizens, the British found that they had to "approach various developmental programs " because “there was little involvement of the local people in planning and executing community development programmes.”

In British Cameroon, European immigrants were subject to the laws of their home country while natives of Cameroon were held to customary law which was typically overseen by British administrators.

The legal system established during the colonial era continues to be implemented, specifically, customary laws and the two legal systems. As the community development programmes grew,  there was a large delay in educational efforts because British Cameroon ". . .had no secondary school in the territory.". Secondary education was largely the work of missionaries such as St. Joseph College which opened in Sasse, Buea, in 1939.

Independence
As French Cameroon gained independence, British Cameroon was still under the administration of Nigeria. French Cameroun became independent, as Cameroun or Cameroon, on January 1, 1960, and Nigeria was scheduled for independence later that same year, which raised the question of what to do with the British territory. As colonizers of Nigeria, the British desired for the two to be united. After some discussion (which had been going on since 1959), a UN-administered plebiscite was agreed to and held on 11 February 1961. The Muslim-majority Northern area opted for union with Nigeria, and the Southern area voted to join Cameroon. No option was given for British Cameroonian independence. The driving force for the unification of east and south Cameroon was Ahmadou Ahidjo and the Kamerun National Democratic Party (KNDP) as the French were not concerned because southern Cameroon did not align with the French community established.

Upon reunification with French Cameroon, Anglophone Cameroonians “made up about 20% of the federal population…their French counterparts made up a majority at 80 percent.”

Northern Cameroons became the Sardauna Province of Northern Nigeria on 1 June 1961, while Southern Cameroons became West Cameroon, a constituent state of the Federal Republic of Cameroon, later that year on 1 October 1961.

Reunification 
During the reunification period, the Anglophone education system began to change as Francophone teachers came to the former British Cameroon. However, because of the language barrier, the teachers would only speak in French or pidgin which hindered the educational development of students. During this period, there began to be preference and domination of the French language as English language certificates became replaced by French certificates.

Despite being united, the Anglophones in Cameroon did not feel represented in government politics. In 1993, the All Anglophone Conference argued at their meeting that “the 1961 Foumban Accord. . .was hardly represented by the Francophone majority who ultimately scrapped the Federal Constitution and replaced it with a Unitary Constitution.”. The Foumban Accord “was the basis  of Cameroon’s post-independence Federal Constitution.”.

Governors

See also

Postage stamps and postal history of British Cameroons
Ambazonia

References

External links

The road to the unitary state of Cameroon 1959-1972
National Service Memoirs of a National Serviceman who served in the British Cameroons at the time of the vote to join with the French Cameroons or Nigeria
 Cameroons under British Administration Trusteeship Documents - UN Documentation: Trusteeship Council

 
British West Africa
History of Cameroon
History of Nigeria
Cameroons, British
Cameroons, British
Cameroons, British
Cameroons, British
Cameroons, British
Cameroon–United Kingdom relations
Nigeria–United Kingdom relations
1922 establishments in the British Empire
1922 establishments in Africa
1961 disestablishments in Africa
States and territories disestablished in 1961